List of English football transfers 2008–09 may refer to:

List of English football transfers summer 2008
List of English football transfers winter 2008–09
List of English football transfers summer 2009

Transfers
2008